Parry Sound/Huron Island Water Aerodrome  is located  south southwest of Parry Sound, Ontario, Canada.

See also
 List of airports in the Parry Sound area

References

Registered aerodromes in Parry Sound District
Seaplane bases in Ontario